Tyurino is a rural locality (a selo) in Kozlovsky Selsoviet of Volodarsky District, Astrakhan Oblast, Russia. The population was 525 as of 2010. There are 4 streets.

Geography 
Tyurino is located 28 km northeast of Volodarsky (the district's administrative centre) by road. Dianovka is the nearest rural locality.

References 

Rural localities in Volodarsky District, Astrakhan Oblast